Leslie Dowdall is an Irish singer-songwriter from Howth, County Dublin. She was the singer in
trad/rock group In Tua Nua in the 1980s and released several solo albums in the late 1990s.

References

External links
 
 MySpace page

Year of birth missing (living people)
Living people
Irish women singer-songwriters